Babu Narayanan (1959  29 June 2019) was an Indian film director who worked in Malayalam film industry. He directed more than 25 Malayalam movies. He was a popular Malayalam movie director during the 1990s. Together with P. Anil, he directed popular movies like Manthrikacheppu, Sthreedhanam, Kudumba Vishesham, Aramana Veedum Anjoorekkarum, Kaliyoonjal and Pattabhishekam. Last movie they did together was Parayam in 2004. Later he took a break from movies. He made a comeback in 2013 with the Malayalam movie To Noora with Love.

Personal life
Babu was born to Narayana Pisharody and Devaki Pisharasiar at Calicut. He was married to Jyothi. The couple had two children, Darsh Pisharody and SRAVANA T N. His daughter debuted as an actress through the film Thattumpurath Achuthan in 2018.

Death
Babu Narayanan died on 29 June 2019 at the age of 60. He was a cancer patient.

Filmography

As a solo director

Anil-Babu

Story
 Om Gurubhyo Nama (2002)

Dialogue
 Ponnaranjanam (1990)

References

External links

Malayalam film directors
1959 births
2019 deaths
Artists from Kozhikode
Film directors from Kerala
21st-century Indian film directors
20th-century Indian film directors